This is a list of the largest shipbuilding companies in 2016 (only companies with revenue of $5 bln. and more are listed):

See also
List of shipbuilders and shipyards

References

 
Largest shipbuilding
Shipbuilding
Shipbuilding